Liu Zong ((?–1015)) was a Chinese government official of the Song Dynasty.

Biography 
Jian'an Jun zhi mou jun shi
shu mi zhi xue shi
tai chang si cheng
you jian yi da fu
Lu Zhou zhi mou zhou jun zhou shi
shang shu sheng li bu lang zhong
Kaifeng Fu zhi mou fu jun fu shi
quan zhi kai feng fu
Hebei Lu zhuan yun fu shi
Shaanxi Lu zhuan yun shi
Hebei Lu zhuan yun shi

Family 
brother:Liu Chuo
son:Liu Jianzhong
son:Liu Zhengzhong
brother:Liu Shen
father:Liu Yan

References

External links

Song dynasty politicians
Year of birth unknown
Year of death unknown
1015 deaths